The right to sit refers to laws or policies granting workers the right to be granted suitable seating at the workplace. Jurisdictions that have enshrined "right to sit" laws or policies include the United Kingdom, Jamaica, South Africa, Eswatini, Tanzania, Uganda, Lesotho, Malaysia, Brazil, Israel, Ireland, the Indian states of Tamil Nadu and Kerala, the Canadian province of Newfoundland and Labrador, and the British overseas territory of Gibraltar and Montserrat. Almost all states of the United States and Australia, as well as the majority of Canadian provinces passed right to sit legislation for women workers between 1881 and 1917. US states with current right to sit legislation include California, Florida, Massachusetts, Montana, New Jersey, New Mexico, New York, Oregon, Pennsylvania, West Virginia, and Wisconsin. A right to sit provision is included in the International Labour Organization's Hygiene (Commerce and Offices) Convention, 1964; the convention being ratified by 51 countries as of 2014. Local jurisdictions with right to sit laws include Portland, Oregon, St. Louis, Missouri and London's Royal Borough of Kensington and Chelsea. Some jurisdictions, such as Alabama, Arkansas, Connecticut, Idaho, Kentucky, Maine, Michigan, Missouri, Nevada, New Hampshire, Quebec, and Washington, D.C. have revoked their right to sit laws. Many right to sit laws originally contained gendered language specifying women workers only. Some jurisdictions maintain gendered laws, but many jurisdictions have amended their right to sit laws to be gender neutral.

Companies with suitable seating policies
The German supermarket chain Aldi allows cashiers to sit while attending to their registers. Aldi allows their workers to sit down not because of concern for worker health or comfort, but rather due to research which suggests that workers who are allowed to sit down are more productive and efficient.

Cashiers typically sit down while working in many European countries. This is partly because many large European retail chains let customers bag their own groceries rather than have the cashier do the bagging.

By jurisdiction
In much of Europe it is the norm for cashiers to sit while working, whereas prolonged standing while working is the norm in most of North America, Asia, and Australia.

International law
Article 14 of the International Labour Organization's Hygiene (Commerce and Offices) Convention, 1964 establishes that "[s]ufficient and suitable seats shall be supplied for workers and workers shall be given reasonable opportunities of using them." This United Nations convention has been ratified by 51 states as of 2014. The law entered into force on 29 March 1966.

Algeria
Algeria ratified the International Labour Organization's Hygiene (Commerce and Offices) Convention, 1964 on 12 June 1969, thereby guaranteeing "Sièges appropriés à la disposition des travailleurs" (Appropriate seats available to workers).

Azerbaijan
Azerbaijan ratified the International Labour Organization's Hygiene (Commerce and Offices) Convention, 1964 on 19 May 1992.

Australia
Along with New Zealand, most states of the United States, and most Canadian provinces, the majority of Australian states and territories passed right to sit legislation during the late 1800s and early 1900s.

New South Wales
New South Wales passed a right to sit law in the 1890s.

Queensland
Queensland passed a right to sit law in the 1890s.

South Australia
In 1896, South Australian MP King O'Malley unsuccessfully introduced the "Seating in Shops Bill" requiring seats to be provided for shop assistants.

Victoria
The state of Victoria had a right to sit law in 1956. The law stated that "[w]hen requested by employees, and where practicable, suitable seats shall be provided by the employer for female employees in positions handy to their work."

Western Australia
Western Australia passed a right to sit law on December 16, 1899.

Belarus
The Byelorussian Soviet Socialist Republic ratified the International Labour Organization's Hygiene (Commerce and Offices) Convention, 1964 on 26 Feb 1968.

Belgium
Belgium ratified the International Labour Organization's Hygiene (Commerce and Offices) Convention, 1964 on 17 May 1978.

Bolivia
Bolivia ratified the International Labour Organization's Hygiene (Commerce and Offices) Convention, 1964 on 31 January 1977.

Brazil
In Brazil, Article 199 of the Consolidation of Labor Laws mandates the placement of seats that assure a worker's right posture, capable of avoiding uncomfortable or forceful positions, whenever the task demands the worker to be seated. This same article has a single paragraph stating, furthermore, that when a worker performs a task standing, seats will be made available during the existing resting periods.

Brazil ratified the International Labour Organization's Hygiene (Commerce and Offices) Convention, 1964 on 24 March 1969.

Bulgaria
Bulgaria ratified the International Labour Organization's Hygiene (Commerce and Offices) Convention, 1964 on 29 March 1965.

Canada
At least six of the ten Canadian provinces have passed right to sit legislation; British Columbia, Manitoba, New Brunswick, Newfoundland and Labrador, Ontario, and Quebec. Quebec's legislation was later revoked.

British Columbia
British Columbia's Factories Act, 1966, provided that if an Inspector can determine that "the whole or a substantial portion of the work upon which female employees are engaged in a factory can be efficiently performed while such employees are seated, the employer shall, forthwith upon being required to do so by the Inspector in writing, provide such seats as may be directed by the Inspector."

Manitoba
In 1888, Manitoba passed the Shops Regulation Act, the highlight of which was "the requirement for employers to provide a sufficient number of suitable seats or chairs for the use of their female employees who shall be permitted to use the same when not necessarily engaged in their work or duty."

New Brunswick
In 1916, the Statutes of New Brunswick were amended to grant the right to sit for female workers. The law was repealed on November 18th, 1974.

Newfoundland and Labrador
The Newfoundland and Labrador Regulation 2012 states that employers in Newfoundland and Labrador states that if a "worker in the course of his or her work has a reasonable opportunity to sit without detriment to his or her work, an employer shall provide and maintain suitable seating for the worker's use to enable him or her to take advantage of that opportunity." The law further states that seating must be "suitably designed, constructed, dimensioned and supported for the worker to do the work, including, where necessary, a footrest that can readily and comfortably support the feet." If standing during work is necessary, the employer must "provide an antifatigue mat, footrest or other suitable device to provide relief."

Ontario
Ontario passed a Shops Regulation Act in 1888, the same year that Manitoba passed similar legislation, the highlight of which included the right to sit for female workers. An 1891 report published by the University College, Toronto on "The Conditions of Female Labour" mentions that while the Shops Regulation Act protected women workers' right to sit, the law was "to a large extent, a dead letter...as there is no system of inspection under the Act." However, the report notes that some scattered attempts at enforcement had been made in Toronto. The report mentions that employers often would not let women workers sit down because they believed sitting gave "an appearance of dullness of trade." Given the lack of enforcement, the report recommended a system of inspection covering the whole province to effectively guarantee the right to sit.

Quebec
During the 1980s and 1990s, Article 11.7.1 of Quebec's "Regulation respecting industrial and commercial establishments" protected a worker's right to sit "where the nature of the work process allows it." In 1989, a middle-aged supermarket cashier with back pain filed a complaint after being denied the right to sit. A Quebec appeals tribunal ruled in favor of the cashier and her union in 1991. Article 11.7.1 was later revoked.

In 2017, a 71-year-old Costco worker in Sainte-Foy, Quebec City, was ordered by his employer to stand while working after he brought a bench to work. He was reprimanded again for leaning against a wall after his bench was prohibited. Stating that "We're not lazy, we're old", the worker insisted on his right to sit. His right to sit was only granted after multiple requests, with Costco demanding that he provide a medical note. After taking his case to upper management, the worker gained the right to sit exception for 15 other Costco workers.

Central African Republic
The Central African Republic ratified the International Labour Organization's Hygiene (Commerce and Offices) Convention, 1964 on 05 June 2006.

Costa Rica
Costa Rica ratified the International Labour Organization's Hygiene (Commerce and Offices) Convention, 1964 on 27 January 1966.

Cuba
Cuba ratified the International Labour Organization's Hygiene (Commerce and Offices) Convention, 1964 on 05 February 1971.

Czech Republic
The Czech Republic ratified the International Labour Organization's Hygiene (Commerce and Offices) Convention, 1964 on 1 January 1993.

Democratic Republic of the Congo
The Democratic Republic of the Congo ratified the International Labour Organization's Hygiene (Commerce and Offices) Convention, 1964 on 5 September 1967.

Denmark
Denmark ratified the International Labour Organization's Hygiene (Commerce and Offices) Convention, 1964 on 17 June 1970.

Djibouti
Djibouti ratified the International Labour Organization's Hygiene (Commerce and Offices) Convention, 1964 on 03 August 1978.

Ecuador
Ecuador ratified the International Labour Organization's Hygiene (Commerce and Offices) Convention, 1964 on 10 March 1969.

Eswatini
Eswatini's Employment Act, 1980, guarantees a worker's right to sit. The act states that "[e]very employer shall, where a substantial proportion of the work being carried out by his employees can be carried out sitting, provide suitable seating for such employees."

Finland
Finland ratified the International Labour Organization's Hygiene (Commerce and Offices) Convention, 1964 on 23 September 1968.

France
France ratified the International Labour Organization's Hygiene (Commerce and Offices) Convention, 1964 on 6 April 1972.

Germany
Germany ratified the International Labour Organization's Hygiene (Commerce and Offices) Convention, 1964 on 5 December 1973.

Ghana
Ghana ratified the International Labour Organization's Hygiene (Commerce and Offices) Convention, 1964 on 21 November 1966.

Guatemala
Guatemala ratified the International Labour Organization's Hygiene (Commerce and Offices) Convention, 1964 on 21 October 1975.

Guinea
Guinea ratified the International Labour Organization's Hygiene (Commerce and Offices) Convention, 1964 on 12 December 1966.

India
The campaign to gain the right to sit in India has been led by working-class feminists, labor union organizers, and communists in South India, particularly in Kerala and Tamil Nadu. Two Indian states have passed right to sit laws as of 2021, with labor activists seeking a nationwide Indian right to sit law.

Kerala
The right to sit movement in India has been led by the Kerala-based feminist labor union Penkoottu. The Penkoottu labor union was founded by Viji Penkoottu, a tailor-activist from the city of Kozhikode.

Kerala passed a right to sit law in 2018, the first law of its kind in India.

Tamil Nadu
Tamil Nadu followed in September 2021, becoming the second Indian state to pass similar legislation. Tamil Nadu's law was introduced by Ganesan C. V, a Dravida Munnetra Kazhagam politician in the Tamil Nadu Legislative Assembly. The right to sit provision was granted as an amended subsection of the Tamil Nadu Shops and Establishments Act, 1947. The amendment, Section 22-A of the Act, reads: "The premises of every establishment shall have suitable seating arrangements for all employees so that they may take advantage of any opportunity to sit which may occur in the course of their work and thereby avoid ‘on their toes’ situation throughout the working hours."

Indonesia
Indonesia ratified the International Labour Organization's Hygiene (Commerce and Offices) Convention, 1964 on 13 June 1969.

Iraq
Iraq ratified the International Labour Organization's Hygiene (Commerce and Offices) Convention, 1964 on 6 March 1987.

Ireland
Labor law in the Republic of Ireland states that employers must provide seating facilities for workers and must provide reasonable opportunities for sitting down.

Israel
In the late 1990s, customers of the Universe Club supermarket chain in Israel complained to Na'amat and the Ministry of Labor, Social Affairs and Social Services that cashiers were not allowed to sit down. Histadrut, Israel's national trade union center, was supportive of workers' right to sit down.

The Right to Sit While Working law in Israel was proposed by Labor Party politician Shelly Yachimovich, an outspoken feminist and social democrat. The law aimed at stopping a common practice in many grocery stores and drug stores where cashiers were asked to work the tills while standing for the entire shift, although there was no practical reason for them not to sit. Labor rights organizations backed the law by claiming that the practice was insulting and disrespectful, while large chain-store retailer Super-Pharm fiercely lobbied against the law, arguing it should reserve the right to serve customers the way it sees fit. The law recognized the right to sit while working, and forced employers to provide chairs for the cashiers, salespersons and service workers unless employers could prove that the job at hand could not have been carried out from a sitting position. The law was passed in February 2007 and went into effect in May 2007. In December 2007, the Histadrut filed a lawsuit against 61 major retail shops and outlets that they alleged were violating the right to sit law, demanding NIS 20 million in compensation.

Italy
Italy ratified the International Labour Organization's Hygiene (Commerce and Offices) Convention, 1964 on 5 May 1971.

Jamaica
Jamaica's Factory Regulations law protects factory workers' right to sit. The law states that where "any persons employed in a factory have in the course of their employment reasonable opportunities for sitting without detriment to their work, there shall be provided and maintained for their use suitable facilities for sitting sufficient to enable them to take advantage of those opportunities." When the majority of work is done while sitting, a worker must be provided by their employer "a seat of a design, construction and dimensions suitable for him and the work, together with a foot-rest on which he can readily and comfortably support his feet if he cannot do so without a foot-rest", and furthermore, "the arrangements shall be such that the seat is adequately and properly supported while in use for the purpose for which it is provided."

Japan
Japan ratified the International Labour Organization's Hygiene (Commerce and Offices) Convention, 1964 on 21 June 1993.

Jordan
Jordan ratified the International Labour Organization's Hygiene (Commerce and Offices) Convention, 1964 on 11 March 1965.

Kenya
In 1949, the Kenya Colony passed legislation requiring that every "female shop assistant or journeyman shall be provided with a chair, seat,or other suitable appliance for use during the hours she is employed in the shop."

In 1984, the city of Mombasa passed the Mombasa Shop Hours Act, a provision of which protected the right to sit for female workers using the exact language of the national 1949 colonial-era right to sit law.

Kyrgyzstan
Kyrgyzstan ratified the International Labour Organization's Hygiene (Commerce and Offices) Convention, 1964 on 31 March 1992.

Latvia
Latvia ratified the International Labour Organization's Hygiene (Commerce and Offices) Convention, 1964 on 8 March 1993.

Lebanon
Lebanon ratified the International Labour Organization's Hygiene (Commerce and Offices) Convention, 1964 on 01 June 1977.

Lesotho
Lesotho's Labour Code Order, 1992 states that "[w]here employees have in the course of their employment reasonable opportunity for sitting without detriment to their work, there shall be provided and maintained for their use suitable seats to enable them to take advantage of those opportunities." Furthermore, the law stipulates that "[w]here a substantial proportion of any work can properly be done sitting, there shall be provided and maintained for each employee doing that work a seat of a design, construction and dimensions suitable for him or her and for the work, together with a back-rest if practicable, and a foot-rest on which he or she can readily and comfortably support his or her feet if he or she cannot do so without a foot-rest."

Luxembourg
Luxembourg ratified the International Labour Organization's Hygiene (Commerce and Offices) Convention, 1964 on 8 April 2008.

Madagascar
Madagascar ratified the International Labour Organization's Hygiene (Commerce and Offices) Convention, 1964 on 21 November 1966.

Malaysia
Malaysian labor law protects a worker's right to suitable seating, with detailed guidelines on properly ensuring suitable seating in the workplace. Regulation 30 (1) of the Factories and Machinery (Safety, Health and Welfare) Regulations 1970 stipulates that "every factory where persons employed have in the course of their employment, reasonable opportunities for sitting without detriment to their work, there shall be provided and maintained suitable and sufficient seating facilities for their use." Regulation 30 (2) stipulates that employers must provide workers in these jobs suitable seating and that the seating "arrangements shall be such that the seat is adequately and properly supported while in use for the purpose for which it is provided." Enforcement of these provisions are carried out by the Malaysian Department of Occupational Safety and Health (DOSH), a department of the Ministry of Human Resources (Malaysia).

Mauritius
In Mauritius, The Occupational Safety and Health Act 2005 protects workers' right to sit.

Mexico
Mexico ratified the International Labour Organization's Hygiene (Commerce and Offices) Convention, 1964 on 18 June 1968.

New Zealand
New Zealand first passed a right to sit law in 1894.

New Zealand had a right to sit law as of 1950. New Zealand labor law stated that it is an "employer's obligation to provide suitable facilities for sitting sufficient to enable female workers whose work is done standing to take advantage of opportunities for rest, while the Inspector may require suitable seats to be provided where he is of opinion that any workers of class of workers in a factory (male or female) can conveniently and satisfactorily do their work or a substantial part thereof while sitting." The law stipulated that the Inspector may check seating as a regular aspect of inspections. A 1950 survey of factories and mills found the enforcement of the law to be "reasonably good".

Norway
Norway ratified the International Labour Organization's Hygiene (Commerce and Offices) Convention, 1964 on 6 June 1966.

Panama
Panama ratified the International Labour Organization's Hygiene (Commerce and Offices) Convention, 1964 on 19 June 1970.

Paraguay
Paraguay ratified the International Labour Organization's Hygiene (Commerce and Offices) Convention, 1964 on 10 July 1967.

Philippines
On April 15, 1952, the Congress of the Philippines passed Republic Act No. 679, a provision of which granted workers the right to sit. The act stipulated that it "shall be the duty of every employer...to provide seats proper for women and children and permit them to use such seats when they are free from work and during working hours, provided they can perform their duties in this position without detriment to efficiency." The law was later repealed on May 1, 1974 by Presidential Decree No. 442.

In 2014, House Bill 5258, titled "Right to Sit Down on the Job Act of 2014", was introduced in the House of Representatives of the Philippines. The bill would require owners of shopping malls, department stores, and other retail outlets to allow their workers to sit when not attending to customers. The law was proposed by Roy Señeres of the Labor Party Philippines. Señeres stated that excessive standing is "deleterious to the health of the workers, especially women" as well as "inhuman as only animals like carabaos, cows and horses can endure being on their feet" all day. A similar bill was introduce in the Senate of the Philippines by Nancy Binay of the United Nationalist Alliance.

Poland
The Polish People's Republic ratified the International Labour Organization's Hygiene (Commerce and Offices) Convention, 1964 on 26 June 1968.

Portugal
Portugal ratified the International Labour Organization's Hygiene (Commerce and Offices) Convention, 1964 on 24 February 1983.

Russia
The Russian Soviet Federative Socialist Republic ratified the International Labour Organization's Hygiene (Commerce and Offices) Convention, 1964 on 22 September 1967.

Saint Kitts and Nevis
The Shops Regulation Act in Saint Kitts and Nevis states that "[t]he owner or occupier of any shop to which this Act applies in which female shop assistants are employed shall at all times provide and keep therein a sufficient number of suitable seats or chairs for the use of such female shop assistants and shall permit them to use such seats or chairs when not necessarily engaged in the work or duty for which they are employed.

Saudi Arabia
Saudi Arabia ratified the International Labour Organization's Hygiene (Commerce and Offices) Convention, 1964 on 07 Dec 2020, with the convention entering into effect on 07 Dec 2021.

Senegal
Senegal ratified the International Labour Organization's Hygiene (Commerce and Offices) Convention, 1964 on 25 April 1966.

Slovakia
Slovakia ratified the International Labour Organization's Hygiene (Commerce and Offices) Convention, 1964 on 1 January 1993.

South Africa
South Africa's Occupational Health and Safety Act of 1993 requires that all employers, where reasonably practicable, must "provide an ergonomically sound seat for every employee whose work can be effectively performed while sitting". Workers whose jobs are usually performed while standing must be allowed to "take advantage of any opportunity for sitting which may occur, and for this purpose the employer shall provide seating facilities." All employers are required to "provide seats with backrests where the nature of work performed by the employees is such that such seats can be used."

South Korea
In 2018, the Federation of Korean Trade Unions demanded that South Korean workers at retail outlets such as Lotte Mart and other supermarkets be allowed to sit down while working. Ten years had passed since South Korean retail workers had first organized for the right to sit in 2008. While the campaign by the Federation of Korean Trade Unions has not secured a change to South Korean law, some supermarkets have begun to offer chairs to their workers. South Korean women who are required to wear high heels while working are at added risk of damage to their health.

Spain
Spain ratified the International Labour Organization's Hygiene (Commerce and Offices) Convention, 1964 on 16 June 1970.

Sri Lanka
Sri Lanka's Shop and Office Employees Act of 1954 established the right to sit for women workers.

Sweden
Sweden ratified the International Labour Organization's Hygiene (Commerce and Offices) Convention, 1964 on 11 June 1965.

Switzerland
Switzerland ratified the International Labour Organization's Hygiene (Commerce and Offices) Convention, 1964 on 18 February 1966.

Syria
Syria ratified the International Labour Organization's Hygiene (Commerce and Offices) Convention, 1964 on 10 June 1965.

Tajikistan
Tajikistan ratified the International Labour Organization's Hygiene (Commerce and Offices) Convention, 1964 on 26 November 1993.

Tanzania
In Tanzania, the Occupational Health and Safety Act, 2003 states that "There shall be provided and maintained for the use of all workers whose work is carried while standing, suitable seats to enable them for sitting to take advantage of any rest period which may occur in the course of their employment."

Tunisia
Tunisia ratified the International Labour Organization's Hygiene (Commerce and Offices) Convention, 1964 on 14 April 1970.

Uganda
Uganda's Occupational Safety and Health Act, 2006 protects workers' right to sit. The act states that workers must be granted a "reasonable opportunity to sit during the period of their work, sufficient and suitable seats shall be provided and maintained by the employer, to enable the workers take advantage of the opportunity to sit." The act also states that if a "substantial proportion of any work can be properly done while sitting, an employer shall provide and maintain, for each employee doing the work, a seat of a design, construction and dimension suitable for that work."

Ukraine
The Ukrainian Soviet Socialist Republic ratified the International Labour Organization's Hygiene (Commerce and Offices) Convention, 1964 on 19 June 1968.

United Kingdom
The United Kingdom first passed a right to sit law on August 9, 1899, the Seats for Shop Assistants Act 1899, establishing that one seat should be provided in shops for every three women.

The United Kingdom ratified the International Labour Organization's Hygiene (Commerce and Offices) Convention, 1964 on 21 April 1967.

In the United Kingdom, the Workplace (Health, Safety and Welfare) Regulations 1992 mandates that employers must provide suitable seating for workers when that are not engaged in work that requires standing. This regulation applies even to workers who can only sit down some of the time. Cashiers are expected to sit down for most of their shift, rather than stand. Floor staff in retail outlets are expected to stand for much of their shifts, but are still granted the right to sit down some of the time. The law also states that seating provided to workers must be "well-designed and comfortable" and must be regularly maintained and replaced when damaged." The law states that a "suitable seat shall be provided for each person at work in the workplace whose work includes operations of a kind that the work (or a substantial part of it) can or must be done sitting." Seating can only be considered suitable if it is "suitable for the person for whom it is provided as well as for the operations to be performed" and "a suitable footrest is also provided where necessary."

The Health and Safety Handbook of the Royal Borough of Kensington and Chelsea in London states that "Suitable seats should be provided for workers to use during breaks." Suitable seating during a worker's break must be located in a suitable place where protective equipment need not be worn. Office workers who sit in office chairs are considered to already have suitable seating. Suitable rest areas with seating must be provided to workers and all new businesses must install separate break rooms.

Gibraltar
The Factories Act of Gibraltar, passed in 1956, protects a workers right to sit. The act reads: "There shall be provided and maintained, for the use of all workers whose work is done standing, suitable facilities for sitting sufficient to enable them to take advantage of any opportunities for resting which may occur in the course of their employment. Where a substantial proportion of any work can properly be done sitting suitable seats shall be provided for all persons employed on such work.

Montserrat
In 2002, Montserrat's revised edition of the Shops Regulation Act established that the "owner or occupier of any shop to which this Act applies in which female shop assistants are employed shall at all times provide and keep therein a sufficient number of suitable seats or chairs for the use of such female shop assistants and shall permit them to use such seats or chairs when not necessarily engaged in the work or duty for which they are employed."

United States

In the late 1800s and early 1900s, during the Progressive Era, numerous states passed laws granting workers the right to suitable seats, specifically for women workers. Principles of Labor Legislation, a foundational labor law text written in 1916 by John R. Commons and John Bertram Andrews, noted that an aspect of early 20th century labor reforms that is "[p]articularly striking is the special protection of women manifested in the laws on seats, toilets, and dressing-rooms." At the time, all right to sit legislation in the United States was gendered, applying specifically to women workers. They write that as "far back as the end of the 'seventies the dangers of constant standing for salesgirls were recognized, and it was urged that they be furnished seats and allowed to use them." They note that the first state to pass right to sit legislation for women workers was New York in 1881. By 1916, almost every state had such a right to sit law for women workers. Most state laws covered manufacturing and mechanical jobs, with some states covering virtually all jobs. Commons and Andrews claimed that these early right to sit laws were "of little real importance in protecting health...since it is practically impossible to see that employers and foremen allow the seats to be used even when provided."

By 1932, almost all of the states, the District of Columbia, and the territories of Puerto Rico and the Philippines, had passed laws requiring some form of suitable seating for women workers. The majority of states with right to sit laws specify that "suitable seats" be provided by employers and that workers be allowed to sit when standing is not required. The only state in the United States without a right to sit law by 1932 was Mississippi.

Several states have subsequently repealed their suitable seating laws, including Alabama, Connecticut, and Kentucky. Many states have amended their right to sit laws with gender neutral language, but some states retain gendered, female-specific laws.

Uruguay
Uruguay ratified the International Labour Organization's Hygiene (Commerce and Offices) Convention, 1964 on 19 Jun 1968.

Venezuela
Venezuela ratified the International Labour Organization's Hygiene (Commerce and Offices) Convention, 1964 on 06 September 1995.

Vietnam
Vietnam ratified the International Labour Organization's Hygiene (Commerce and Offices) Convention, 1964 on 03 October 1994.

Health risks of excessive standing
In the 17th century, the Italian physician Bernardino Ramazzini published De Morbis Artificum Diatriba ("Diseases of Workers"), one of the first recorded works arguing that prolonged standing was injurious to the health of workers. In the chapter concerning "Workers Who Stand", Ramazzini called for a reduction in hours spent standing while working. Ramazzini cites carpenters, loggers, carvers, blacksmiths, and masons as examples of workers required to stand for great lengths of time.

Studies conducted by Canadian researchers involving workers in Ontario determined that cashiers, chefs, machine tool operators, and other workers who are required to stand for long hours, are at heightened risk of cardiovascular disease compared to workers who mostly sit down.

The Union of Shop, Distributive and Allied Workers in the United Kingdom supports workers' right to sit, stating that excessive standing "can cause backache and pain in the legs".

Criticism of gendered provisions
Professor Carol Louw of the University of South Africa claims that female-specific provisions in right to sit laws "reinforced stereotypes regarding women's frailty." Law professors Sacha Prechal and Noreen Burrows argued against sex-specific provisions in right to sit laws because "working conditions should be as safe and as pleasant as possible for all employees" regardless of sex.

See also
 Pink-collar worker
 Right to sit in the United States
 Seats for Shop Assistants Act 1899
 Sitting
 Women in the workforce
 Women's work

References

External links
 "Stop Forcing Workers to Stand on the Job", Jacobin

Ageism
Labour movement
Labor rights
Occupational safety and health
Retailing
 
Women's rights
Working-class feminism